The 1994 Survivor Series was the eighth annual Survivor Series professional wrestling pay-per-view (PPV) event produced by the World Wrestling Federation (WWF, now WWE). It took place on Thanksgiving Eve on November 23, 1994, at the Freeman Coliseum in San Antonio, Texas. Since its inception, Survivor Series always took place on the traditional Thanksgiving Eve/Day date; the following Survivor Series and all subsequent shows have taken place on various Sundays before Thanksgiving (the 2005 and 2006 events were exceptions, as they were held in the Sunday after Thanksgiving weekend).

Two main event matches were held; in the first, Bob Backlund won the WWF Championship from Bret Hart in a submission match after Bret's brother Owen convinced their mother to throw in a towel to end the match. In the other main event, The Undertaker defeated Yokozuna in a casket match with Chuck Norris as the special guest ring enforcer.

The event also featured three elimination matches and two singles matches. Razor Ramon led The Bad Guys against Diesel's team of The Teamsters. Ramon won the match for his team after all members of the other team were counted out. Doink the Clown teamed with three midgets to form Clowns Are Us in a match against The Royal Family, composed of Jerry Lawler and three midgets. The Royal Family won the match, but all seven other competitors attacked Lawler after the match. Lex Luger led Guts and Glory against the Million Dollar Corporation team, which was managed by Ted DiBiase. DiBiase's team won after Luger, the last wrestler from his team, was pinned.

Shawn Michaels and Diesel, the WWF Tag Team Champions going into the event, began feuding after Michaels accidentally kicked Diesel during the match. They vacated their title and began a feud that led to a match at WrestleMania XI. Three days after Survivor Series, Diesel won the WWF World Heavyweight Championship by defeating Backlund. The rivalry between Backlund and Bret Hart continued, and they also faced each other at WrestleMania XI.

Production

Background
Survivor Series is an annual gimmick pay-per-view (PPV), produced every November by the World Wrestling Federation (WWF, now WWE) since 1987. In what has become the second longest running pay-per-view event in history (behind WWE's WrestleMania), it is one of the promotion's original four pay-per-views, along with WrestleMania, SummerSlam, and Royal Rumble, and was considered one of the "Big Five" PPVs, along with King of the Ring. The event is traditionally characterized by having Survivor Series matches, which are tag team elimination matches that typically pits teams of four or five wrestlers against each other. The 1994 event was the eighth event in the Survivor Series chronology and was scheduled to be held on Thanksgiving Eve on November 23, 1994, at the Freeman Coliseum in San Antonio, Texas.

Storylines

The professional wrestling matches at Survivor Series featured professional wrestlers performing as characters in scripted events pre-determined by the hosting promotion, WWF. Storylines between the characters played out on WWF's primary television program, Monday Night Raw.

Several storylines formed the background for the opening match, which saw the fan favorite team of The Bad Guys (Razor Ramon, the 1-2-3 Kid, Davey Boy Smith (a.k.a the British Bulldog) and The Headshrinkers) square off against the villainous team of The Teamsters (Shawn Michaels, Diesel, Jeff Jarrett, Owen Hart and Jim Neidhart). Razor Ramon had been feuding with Shawn Michaels since September 1993 when Ramon won the WWF Intercontinental Championship. Michaels, the former champion, had been stripped of the belt. WWF President Jack Tunney scheduled a battle royal, in which Ramon and Rick Martel were the final participants remaining. They faced each other on Monday Night Raw, and Ramon won the match and was awarded the title. Michaels claimed that he was the rightful holder of the belt and refused to acknowledge Ramon as the champion. Diesel was serving as Michaels' bodyguard but soon became an active wrestler and carried on Michaels' feud with Ramon. In the months leading up to Survivor Series, Ramon had also developed a feud with Jeff Jarrett, and the two faced each other several times with the Intercontinental Championship on the line. Ramon's friend, the 1-2-3 Kid, took Ramon's side in these feuds, and the two formed an occasional tag team. The Headshrinkers had also been feuding with Michaels and Diesel since dropping the WWF Tag Team Championship to them on August 28. The Headshrinkers had several rematches but were unable to regain the belts. Finally, Davey Boy Smith was involved in a feud with his real-life brother-in-law Owen Hart and Hart's other brother-in-law, Jim Neidhart. Owen Hart had turned on his brother Bret at the 1994 Royal Rumble, after which Smith got involved on Bret's side and Neidhart took Owen's side.

Although Jerry Lawler and Doink the Clown (Matt Osborne) had a storyline rivalry that dated back to when Doink turned on Lawler by dumping a bucket of water on him after SummerSlam 1993, the feud had rarely been mentioned since then. On the September 10, 1994 episode of WWF Superstars of Wrestling, however, Lawler provoked Doink by popping balloons carried by Doink's midget sidekick Dink. The rivalry soon led to Lawler introducing a midget named Queasy, who dressed like Lawler. Doink and Lawler then introduced many more midgets over the following weeks. An elimination match was booked for Survivor Series, with Lawler, Queasy, Sleazy and Cheesy facing Doink, Dink, Wink and Pink.

Bret Hart's feud with Bob Backlund dated back to the July 30, 1994 episode of WWF Superstars of Wrestling. Backlund believed that he had won the match and the WWF World Heavyweight Championship by defeating Hart. The match had not ended, however, and Hart pinned Backlund. When Hart tried to shake Backlund's hand after the match, Backlund slapped him in the face and locked him in a crossface chickenwing. After that Backlund began acting in a completely different manner than he had before, demanding respect from his fellow wrestlers insisting that they call him "Mr. Backlund" and using the crossface chickenwing, a hold he said was unbreakable, on them if they did not adhere to his wishes. He claimed that he had never truly been beaten for the WWF World Heavyweight Championship on December 26, 1983, as the match ended when his manager, Arnold Skaaland, threw a towel into the ring rather than allowing Backlund to submit to The Iron Sheik's camel clutch. Playing off of this, a rematch between Hart and Backlund was signed for Survivor Series. The match was signed as a submission match, but with the stipulation that the only way for a wrestler to win was to have the other person throw in a towel. Since this required a wrestler to have a cornerman, each of the participants chose one. The challenger chose Owen Hart, while the champion went with Davey Boy Smith.

The central feud in the match between Guts & Glory and The Million Dollar Team was between Lex Luger and Ted DiBiase's Million Dollar Corporation. During 1994, DiBiase had "purchased" the contracts of several wrestlers to form a heel stable. Among the members to join were Bam Bam Bigelow and King Kong Bundy. Prior to SummerSlam 1994, DiBiase claimed to have added Luger to the group. Luger denied having joined, despite Tatanka claiming that he had evidence that Luger had "sold out" to DiBiase. Luger and Tatanka faced each other at SummerSlam, where it was revealed that the storyline was a swerve, as Tatanka turned on Luger to join the Million Dollar Corporation. Bigelow and Adam Bomb had also been feuding since the September 10, 1994 episode of Superstars of Wrestling. Bigelow attacked his opponent, a jobber, before the match. DiBiase then claimed that the company was not providing suitable competition, and he challenged any wrestler to face Bigelow. Bomb responded, and the two brawled briefly. Leading up to Survivor Series, Bomb and Bigelow faced each other at several house shows. The Heavenly Bodies were not members of DiBiase's stable, but they competed on behalf of the group. At the time, they were involved in a feud with The Smoking Gunns as a result of a match on the September 3 episode of Superstars of Wrestling. The Heavenly Bodies attacked the Gunns prior to the match and stole the Gunns' cowboy hats. They put on the hats to mock the Gunns and then threw them on the ground and stomped on them. To get revenge, the Gunns stole The Heavenly Bodies' ring robes and tore the wings off them.

The feud between The Undertaker and Yokozuna began at Survivor Series 1993. During an elimination match, Yokozuna was unable to injure The Undertaker, despite slamming The Undertaker's head into the ring steps and performing the Banzai drop on him. A match was booked for Royal Rumble 1994, in which The Undertaker would challenge WWF World Heavyweight Champion Yokozuna for the title in a Casket match. During the match, which featured a no-disqualification clause, Mr. Fuji, Yokozuna's manager, hired nine other wrestlers to interfere on Yokozuna's behalf. Yokozuna won the match after opening The Undertaker's urn, which, according to the storyline, contained the secret to The Undertaker's powers. After the match, The Undertaker appeared on the video screen and vowed to return to the World Wrestling Federation one day. He was not seen for several months, although, in reality, he was taking time off wrestling to allow injuries to heal. The Undertaker returned at SummerSlam 1994, defeating an Undertaker look-alike. A rematch against Yokozuna was scheduled for Survivor Series. This was also to be a Casket match, but Chuck Norris was brought in as a special outside referee to prevent interference.

Event

The first match of the event saw The Bad Guys, which consisted of Razor Ramon, the 1-2-3 Kid, the British Bulldog, and The Headshrinkers (Sione and Fatu) versus The Teamsters, composed of Diesel, Shawn Michaels, Jeff Jarrett, Owen Hart, and Jim Neidhart. The opening minutes of the match featured brothers-in-law Hart and Smith trading moves as well as Jarrett and Ramon brawling. Fatu became the first wrestler eliminated after Diesel performed a Jackknife powerbomb on him. Diesel eliminated the 1-2-3 Kid forty-two seconds later after another Jackknife powerbomb. Sione followed thirty-one seconds later after being pinned by Diesel. Davey Boy Smith entered the ring, but Diesel soon knocked him between the ropes to the arena floor. Hart and Neidhart prevented Smith from getting back in the ring, and Smith was eliminated after the referee counted him out. Razor Ramon was left as the only member of his team to face the five members of The Teamsters. He fought with Diesel for several minutes, but Diesel then performed the Jackknife powerbomb on him and prepared to pin him for the victory. Michaels insisted on having Diesel hold Ramon while Michaels performed a superkick on their opponent. Ramon dodged the kick, and Michaels kicked Diesel in the face. Diesel became angry at Michaels, particularly because the same mistake had cost Diesel the Intercontinental Championship at SummerSlam. He and Michaels argued outside the ring while the rest of the team attempted to calm them down. The referee counted all five wrestlers out of the ring and declared Razor Ramon the winner of the match. Shawn Michaels was shown backstage after the match, and he stated that he was disbanding his tag team with Diesel and vacating the Tag Team Championship. He then got into a car and drove away from the arena.

The next match was between Jerry Lawler's team, known as The Royal Family (with Queasy, Sleazy, and Cheesy), and Doink's Clowns Are Us team (with Dink, Wink, and Pink). The rules were that only midgets could fight midgets and that neither Lawler nor Doink was allowed to attack the midgets. The match consisted of comedic action for much of the first ten minutes. Eventually, Doink attempted a crossbody, but Lawler reversed the move. until Lawler was able to pin Doink and eliminate him from the match. Lawler remained involved in the match and played a role in the elimination of two more members of Doink's team. When Wink attempted a monkey flip against Queasy, Lawler blocked the move and helped Queasy to pin Wink. Later in the match, Lawler threw Cheesy on top of Pink, which enabled Cheesy to eliminate another of Doink's teammates. After Wink and Pink were eliminated, however, they hid under the ring rather than returning backstage. The final member of Clowns Are Us was eliminated after Sleazy and Dink fought in the ring. Dink performed a crossbody on Sleazy and attempted to pin him. Queasy rolled the wrestlers over so that Sleazy was on top, however, and the referee made the three count and awarded the match to The Royal Family. As Queasy, Sleazy and Cheesy celebrated after the match, Lawler criticized them for taking credit for the victory. Dink, Pink, and Wink emerged from under the ring. All six midgets turned against Lawler and chased him away from the ring. As Lawler tried to escape, Doink returned and hit him in the face with a pie.

The next match was the submission match between champion Bret Hart and challenger Bob Backlund, with the aforementioned stipulation being that the only way to win the match was to have the opposing cornerman (either Owen Hart or Davey Boy Smith) throw in the towel. Bret got the early advantage and wore down Backlund using head locks, but Backlund broke free and attempted a crossface chickenwing on Bret. Bret escaped, but Backlund maintained the advantage by attacking Bret's arm and attempting another crossface chickenwing. Bret used a figure four leglock on Backlund, but Backlund got out of the hold. Bret then applied the Sharpshooter, his signature hold, on Backlund. Owen entered the ring and clotheslined Bret from behind, causing him to break the hold, and exited the ring. Smith then chased Owen around the ring, but fell and was kayfabe knocked unconscious on the ring steps. While Bret was distracted, Backlund applied the crossface chickenwing. Owen looked on in disbelief at what was happening to Bret and went to the ringside area, where their parents Stu and Helen Hart were sitting. Owen begged them to throw Bret's towel in to the ring to save him as Backlund kept the hold locked in for what would eventually total nine and a half minutes. Stu refused to do so, not trusting Owen's motives, but Helen overruled him and tossed the towel into the ring. Owen then ran into the ring and showed the referee Bret's towel, and the match and championship were awarded to Backlund as Owen took off backstage holding the towel over his head triumphantly, saying later that this Thanksgiving would be the best ever due to him having finally cost Bret the WWF World Heavyweight Championship after trying and failing to do so himself.

The team of Guts and Glory, consisting of Lex Luger, Adam Bomb, Mabel, and The Smoking Gunns (Billy Gunn and Bart Gunn), faced The Million Dollar Team, made up of Tatanka, Bam Bam Bigelow, King Kong Bundy, and The Heavenly Bodies (Tom Prichard and Jimmy Del Ray) in the next match. Guts and Glory took the early lead when Mabel pinned Prichard after performing a crossbody from the second rope. Mabel fought Bundy and Bigelow, but he was counted out after clotheslining Bigelow out of the ring. Bigelow then performed a moonsault on Bomb and got a pinfall. Luger and Del Ray fought back and forth until Luger performed a running forearm smash on Del Ray to get the pinfall. The Smoking Gunns were eliminated next, as Tatanka pinned Bart and Bundy pinned Billy. Luger fought back by pinning Tatanka with a small package. Seven seconds later, Bundy pinned Luger after performing a splash to get the victory. Bundy, Bigelow, and Tatanka continued to attack Luger after the match until Luger's team returned to the ring to save him.

The main event was next, featuring The Undertaker versus Yokozuna in a casket match with Chuck Norris as the special outside referee. The Undertaker gained the early advantage, but Yokozuna reversed the momentum with a Samoan drop. He tried to put The Undertaker in the casket, but The Undertaker fought back. Yokozuna next performed a leg drop and placed The Undertaker in the casket. Before Yokozuna could close the lid, however, The Undertaker attacked him and the two wrestlers fought while standing in the casket. During the scuffle inside the casket, Mr. Fuji tried to interfere by grabbing the Undertaker from the back of his hair but he turned around, stalked Fuji and grabbed him with both hands on his throat. Cornette attempted to interfere as well, but he was struck down by the Undertaker.  The Undertaker performed a clothesline from the top rope and placed Yokozuna in the casket. King Kong Bundy and Bam Bam Bigelow came down the aisle toward the ring, but Chuck Norris blocked their path. While Norris was distracted, however, Irwin R. Schyster entered the ring from the other side and attacked The Undertaker. He placed The Undertaker in the casket, but The Undertaker recovered before Yokozuna could close the lid. Jeff Jarrett tried to interfere on Yokozuna's behalf, but Norris stopped him with a superkick. The Undertaker performed a DDT and a big boot on Yokozuna. He then rolled his opponent in to the casket along with the Japanese flag that was snatched from Fuji's hand, and snapped in two, and closed the lid to gain the victory.

Aftermath
Shortly after Survivor Series, Diesel was named the top contender to Backlund's title. Backlund's first defense of his title was made at a Madison Square Garden live show three days after Survivor Series, where Diesel defeated him with the Jackknife Powerbomb in eight seconds. With the victory, Diesel joined Hart and Pedro Morales as the only wrestlers to that point to be Triple Crown Champion and became the quickest to do so having won all three components within the span of seven months.  This record was broken by CM Punk in 2009.

Hart returned at the Royal Rumble in January 1995, where he faced Diesel to try to regain his title. Backlund interfered in the match, restarting the rivalry and leading to an I Quit match at WrestleMania XI. Hart won the match by using the crossface chickenwing to make Backlund concede defeat.

To fill the vacancy created when Diesel and Michaels broke up, an eight team tournament was announced with the finals scheduled for the Royal Rumble. The 1-2-3 Kid and Bob Holly won the tournament by defeating Tatanka and Bam Bam Bigelow and won the titles but dropped the belts the following night to The Smoking Gunns.

Michaels and Diesel's feud resumed at the Royal Rumble when Michaels attacked Diesel during his match with Hart. Michaels then became the top contender for the WWF World Heavyweight Championship by winning the 1995 Royal Rumble match. Diesel won their match at WrestleMania after Sid, Michaels' new bodyguard, accidentally distracted the referee. Diesel offered Michaels a rematch, and Michaels told Sid that his services would not be required during the rematch. Sid attacked Michaels, and Diesel came to Michaels' defense. This attack caused Michaels to turn face, and he and Diesel resumed their friendship and won the WWF Tag Team Championship later in 1995.

Lex Luger's feud with the Million Dollar Corporation did not continue, as the Corporation targeted The Undertaker. The Undertaker spent most of the following year feuding with the Corporation, as he faced IRS at the 1995 Royal Rumble, King Kong Bundy at WrestleMania XI, and Kama at SummerSlam 1995. Luger was placed in a tag team with Davey Boy Smith known as The Allied Powers, but the team never won the tag team titles. The team was dissolved in the summer of 1995 after Smith turned heel and Luger left the company following SummerSlam to return to World Championship Wrestling.

Yokozuna did not regain his main event status after Survivor Series. After taking some time off, he made a surprise return at WrestleMania XI as Owen Hart's partner in a tag team title match against the Smoking Gunns. Yokozuna and Hart won the WWF Tag Team Championship, and Owen's feud with Bret was dropped. The brothers eventually reunited in 1997 to form The Hart Foundation, a stable that also included Davey Boy Smith and Jim Neidhart.

Results

Survivor Series elimination matches

References

External links
1994 Survivor Series Results at Pro Wrestling History
Survivor Series '94 review at Hoffco, Inc. 
Survivor Series '94 Review at Online World of Wrestling
Official 1994 Survivor Series website

Events in San Antonio
1994
1994 in Texas
Professional wrestling in San Antonio
1994 WWF pay-per-view events
November 1994 events in the United States